Lieutenant General Donald Stuart McIver,  (22 January 1936 – 22 August 2016) was a New Zealand military officer who was the Chief of the General Staff (1987–1989) and the director of the New Zealand Security Intelligence Service (1991–1999).

During the Vietnam War he served as the 2IC of the final regiment of combined Australian and New Zealand infantry, 4 RAR/NZ (ANZAC) of the 1st Australian Task Force in 1971. 

In the 1981 New Year Honours, McIver was appointed an Officer of the Order of the British Empire. He was made a Companion of the Order of St Michael and St George in the 1995 Queen's Birthday Honours.

References

 

|-

1936 births
2016 deaths
New Zealand Companions of the Order of St Michael and St George
New Zealand generals
New Zealand military personnel of the Malayan Emergency
New Zealand military personnel of the Vietnam War
New Zealand Officers of the Order of the British Empire
New Zealand public servants